The Book Cliffs are a series of desert mountains and cliffs in western Colorado and eastern Utah in the Western United States. They are so named because the cliffs of Cretaceous sandstone that cap many of the south-facing buttes appear similar to a shelf of books.

Stratigraphy

The Book Cliffs are one of the world's best places to study sequence stratigraphy. In the 1980s, Exxon scientists used the Cretaceous strata of the Book Cliffs to develop the science of sequence stratigraphy. The Book Cliffs have preserved excellent strata of the foreland basin of the ancient Western Interior Seaway that stretched north from the Gulf of Mexico to the Yukon in the Cretaceous Period. Components of deltaic and shallow marine reservoirs are very well preserved in the Book Cliffs.

Wildlife
Large mammals found in the Book Cliffs include coyotes, mountain lions, bobcats, mule deer, elk, black bears, pronghorn, American bison as an extension of the Henry Mountains bison herd and bighorn sheep.

There are also many small streams that contain a variety of trout species. 

In January 2009, Utah Division of Wildlife Resources officials transplanted 31 bison from the Henry Mountains bison herd to the Book Cliffs. The new group joined 14 animals previously released in August, 2008 from a private herd on the nearby Uintah and Ouray Indian Reservation.

See also

 List of mountains in Colorado
 List of mountains in Utah
 Roan Cliffs

References

External links 

"Book Cliffs Recreation Area" at U.S. Department of Interior

Bureau of Land Management areas in Colorado
Bureau of Land Management areas in Utah
Cliffs of the United States
Colorado Plateau
Mountains of Carbon County, Utah
Mountains of Colorado
Mountains of Emery County, Utah
Mountains of Garfield County, Colorado
Mountains of Grand County, Utah
Mountains of Mesa County, Colorado
Mountains of Utah
Stratigraphy of Colorado
Stratigraphy of Utah